Kirsten Hedegaard Jensen (born 23 February 1935) is a Danish former swimmer. She competed in the women's 200 metre breaststroke at the 1952 Summer Olympics.

References

1935 births
Living people
Danish female swimmers
Olympic swimmers of Denmark
Swimmers at the 1952 Summer Olympics
Sportspeople from Frederiksberg